Courtdale is a borough in Luzerne County, Pennsylvania, United States. The population was 689 at the 2020 census.

History
Courtdale was incorporated as a borough in 1897. During the 19th and 20th centuries, coal mining and manufacturing were the major industries in the area.

Geography
It is part of the Wyoming Valley West School District.

Demographics

As of the census of 2000, there were 791 people, 315 households, and 230 families residing in the borough. The population density was 771.5 people per square mile (296.5/km2). There were 328 housing units at an average density of 319.9 per square mile (123.0/km2). The racial makeup of the borough was 99.75% White and 0.25% Asian.

There were 315 households, out of which 27.0% had children under the age of 18 living with them, 58.7% were married couples living together, 9.2% had a female householder with no husband present, and 26.7% were non-families. 24.4% of all households were made up of individuals, and 12.7% had someone living alone who was 65 years of age or older. The average household size was 2.51 and the average family size was 2.97.

In the borough the population was spread out, with 20.9% under the age of 18, 6.3% from 18 to 24, 25.7% from 25 to 44, 28.1% from 45 to 64, and 19.1% who were 65 years of age or older. The median age was 43 years. For every 100 females there were 92.9 males. For every 100 females age 18 and over, there were 92.0 males.

The median income for a household in the borough was $38,150, and the median income for a family was $44,500. Males had a median income of $34,219 versus $25,234 for females. The per capita income for the borough was $17,765. About 7.5% of families and 8.7% of the population were below the poverty line, including 12.0% of those under age 18 and 19.2% of those age 65 or over.

References

Populated places established in 1897
Boroughs in Luzerne County, Pennsylvania
1897 establishments in Pennsylvania